The flag of Pakistan traces its current form back to a meeting of the Constituent Assembly of Pakistan on 11 August 1947, three days before the Partition of British India, when it was adopted by the All-India Muslim League as the official flag-to-be of the Dominion of Pakistan. It was retained upon the establishment of a constitution in 1956, and remains in use as the national flag for the present-day Islamic Republic of Pakistan. The flag is made up of a green field with a stylized tilted white crescent moon and five-pointed star at its centre, and a vertical white stripe at its hoist-end. Though the specific shade of green on the flag is mandated only as 'dark green', its official and most consistent representation is in Pakistan green, which is shaded distinctively darker.

Most notably, the flag is referred to in the third verse of Pakistan's national anthem, and is widely flown on several important days of the year, including Republic Day, Independence Day and Defence Day. It is also hoisted every morning at schools, offices and government buildings to the playing of the national anthem and lowered again before sunset. A very elaborate flag-raising and lowering ceremony is carried out every evening by the Pakistan Rangers and their Indian Border Security Force counterparts at the Wagah–Attari border crossing between India and Pakistan, which is regularly attended by hundreds of spectators. The Government of Pakistan has formalized rules and regulations related to the flying of the national flag; it is to be displayed all day at full-mast on 23 March annually to commemorate the adoption of the Lahore Resolution in 1940 and the declaration of Pakistan as an independent Islamic republic with a constitution in 1956, both of which occurred on the same day. The same regulations also apply on 14 August annually, in celebration of Pakistan's day of independence; when the country was carved out from erstwhile British India as the homeland and nation-state for the Muslims of the Indian subcontinent.

History

In 1947, the Viceroy of India, Louis Mountbatten, proposed a national flag for the state of Pakistan which comprised the flag of the All-India Muslim League albeit with a Union Jack in the canton. This proposal was rejected by Muhammad Ali Jinnah on the grounds that a flag featuring both Saint George's Christian Cross alongside an Islamic star and crescent would not be accepted by the Pakistani people.

Symbolism
The Islamic green of the flag represents the Muslim-majority populace of Pakistan while the white stripe on the hoist-end represents its various religious minorities i.e. Non-Muslims, such as Hindus, Christians, Sikhs, Zoroastrians and others. The combined star and crescent serve as a symbol of Islam, with the crescent representing progress and the five-pointed star representing light and knowledge. The flag symbolizes Pakistan's commitment to both Islam as well as the rights of religious minorities.

The Pakistan Flag is based on the original flag of the Muslim League, which itself drew inspiration from the flag of the Ottoman Empire.

Design

The official design of the national flag was adopted by the Constituent Assembly together with a definition of the features and proportions.

According to the specifications, it is a dark green rectangular flag in the proportion of length [A] and width [B] as 3:2 with a white vertical bar at the mast, the green portion bearing a white crescent in the centre and a five-pointed white heraldic star. The width of the white portion [C] is one quarter the length of the flag [A], nearest the mast, so the green portion occupies the remaining three quarters [D].
Draw a diagonal L3 from the top right-hand corner to the bottom left corner of the green portion. On this diagonal establish two points P1 and P2. P1 is positioned at the centre of the green portion and P2 at the intersection of the diagonal L3 and an arc C4 created from the top right-hand corner equal to 13/20 the height of the flag [E]. With the centre at point P1 and a radius 3/10 the height of the flag describe the first circle C1 and with the centre at point P2 and a radius 11/40 the height of the flag describe a second circle C2. The enclosures made by these two circles form the crescent. The dimensions of the five-pointed white heraldic star are determined by drawing a circle C3 with a radius 1/10 the height of the flag positioned between P2 and P3 on the diagonal L3. The circle surrounds the five points of the heraldic star and the star lies with one point on the diagonal L3 at point P3 where circle C1 intersects the diagonal L3.
The flag is coloured in Pakistan green having standard RGB values (red = 0, green = 64, blue = 26) or with hex triplet #00401A or the HSV value = (h = 144, s = 100, v = 25). The left strip, the star and the crescent are painted in white. The flag is supported from left white side.

Dimensions
The Interior Ministry of Pakistan provides dimensions for flags in different circumstances:
 For ceremonial occasions: 24′ × 16′, 21′ × 14′, 18′ × 12′, 11′ × ′ or 9′ × ′.
 For use over buildings: 6′ × 4′ or 3′ × 2′.
 For cars: 24″ × 16″.
 For tables: ″ × ″.

Colour scheme

The official design says "dark green". However, #00401A seems to be the most widely used colour.

National flag protocols

 No other flag must fly higher (except the United Nations flag at United Nations buildings).
 When displayed or flown alongside other national flags, the National Flag must be displayed or flown at the same height as the other national flags, never lower.
 When displayed alongside provincial, military or corporate flags, the National Flag must be higher.
 When tied to a mast, it must be tied only at the left (at the beginning of the white bar) and left to fly freely without any obstruction.
 Must not touch the ground, shoes or feet or anything unclean.
 Must never be flown in darkness.
 Must be raised at dawn and lowered at dusk (except on the Parliament of Pakistan, which is the only official building on which the flag is never lowered). When flown over the Parliament of Pakistan at night, it must always remain alit with artificial light
 Must not be marked with anything (including words or pictures).
 When raising: (i) must be saluted to by all uniformed personnel, (ii) others must stand in attention.
 Must be raised or lowered ceremoniously.
 Must never be displayed vertically. 
 When displayed horizontally, the white strip must always be at the left, with green field on the right.
 Must not fly or be displayed upside down or with the crescent and star facing left.
 Must not be displayed anywhere where it is likely to get dirty.
 Must not be set on fire or trampled upon.
 Must not be buried or lowered into a grave (when burying a flag-bearing casket, the National Flag must be detached from the casket and held above the grave as the casket is lowered or removed from the casket before burial).

Flag flying days

Use by public officials
The use of the national flag is regulated by the Pakistan Flag Rules, which were introduced in 2002 by Prime Minister Zafarullah Khan Jamali. The rules are not available online but there have been instances of misuse such as officials using flags on their vehicles when they are not entitled to do so. The national flag is flown on the official residences and vehicles (cars, boats, planes) of the following public officials:

Milestones 
 2019 – The largest balloon mosaic (flag) is 180.172 m2 (1939 ft² 37 in²) achieved by Pakistan Hindu Council (Pakistan) in Islamabad, Pakistan, on 5 August 2019. It is a Guinness World Record.
2017 – On 14 August, People of Balochistan hoisted a 2-mile-long flag of Pakistan in Quetta. 
 2014 – On 15 February, 29,040 people gathered in a stadium in Lahore to form the flag of Pakistan and set a new world record for forming the world's largest national flag comprising humans, which was certified by Guinness World Records.
 2012 – On 22 October, 24,200 people gathered in a stadium in Lahore to form the flag of Pakistan and set a new world record for forming the world's largest national flag comprising humans, which was certified by Guinness World Records.
 2004 – In August, a 340 × 510 ft (173,400 square foot) flag of Pakistan was unfurled at the National Stadium Karachi, setting the world record for the largest flag.
 1947 – On the night of 14 August 1947, a group of Indian Boy Scouts were in France when the news reached them that their country had become independent. Mohammad Iqbal Qureshi was one of the Muslim boy scouts who with the help of his friends turned a green turban into a Pakistani flag and unfurled it. 15 August 1947 was the first time when the Pakistani flag flew on foreign soil.

See also

 State emblem of Pakistan
 Flag of the President of Pakistan
 Flags of the World
 List of Pakistani flags
 National Anthem of Pakistan
 Vexillology

References

Further reading

External links
 
 

Pakistan
Pakistan
National symbols of Pakistan
Pakistan
Pakistan